Jolet Caroline Hartenhof (born 23 September 1979) is a Dutch former cricketer who played as a right-arm fast-medium bowler. She appeared in one Test match, 28 One Day Internationals and four Twenty20 Internationals for the Netherlands between 1998 and 2011.

References

External links
 
 

1979 births
Living people
Sportspeople from The Hague
Dutch women cricketers
Netherlands women Test cricketers
Netherlands women One Day International cricketers
Netherlands women Twenty20 International cricketers
20th-century Dutch women
21st-century Dutch women